Vahejärv refers to several lakes in Estonia:
Nelijärve Vahejärv, Anija Parish, Harju County
Neeruti Vahejärv, Otepää Parish, Valga County